Joshua Randolph Hansen (born January 16, 1982 in Phoenix, Arizona) is an American-born Puerto Rican international football player.

Career

College
Hansen attended Greenway High School and played four years of college soccer at the University of San Francisco, where he won several honors and his exploits included a hat-trick against Saint Mary's College.

Professional
Hansen spent 2005 with the championship-winning Seattle Sounders of the USL First Division, but saw little playing time. In an attempt to re-ignite his career, Hansen joined the Southern California Seahorses of the USL Premier Development League in 2006, scoring  8 goals in 15 matches.

On August 30, 2006, following the conclusion of the PDL season. Hansen was signed by the Los Angeles Galaxy, having appeared and scored a goal as a guest player for the Galaxy reserves in a game against the Colorado Rapids reserves earlier in the same month.

Hansen was waived by the Galaxy during the 2007 pre-season, having never played a senior game for the team, and was subsequently signed by the California Victory. He was then transferred to Vancouver Whitecaps FC during the 2007 season. Hansen was waived by the Whitecaps in January 2008. He signed with the Puerto Rico Islanders in the USL First Division in early 2008.

Honors

Puerto Rico Islanders
 USSF Division 2 Pro League Champions (1): 2010
 Commissioner's Cup  Winners (1): 2008
 CFU Club Championship Winner (1): 2010

References

External links
 Puerto Rico Islanders bio
 
 

1982 births
Living people
American soccer players
Puerto Rican footballers
Puerto Rico international footballers
LA Galaxy players
Association football forwards
Seattle Sounders (1994–2008) players
USL First Division players
California Victory players
Southern California Seahorses players
Vancouver Whitecaps (1986–2010) players
San Francisco Dons men's soccer players
Puerto Rico Islanders players
Expatriate soccer players in Canada
USSF Division 2 Professional League players
USL League Two players
North American Soccer League players
Soccer players from Phoenix, Arizona